Frederik Søgaard Mortensen (born 25 July 1997) is a Danish badminton player. He was the silver medalist in the boys' doubles at the 2015 World Junior Championships and in the mixed doubles at the 2015 European Junior Championships and also won bronzes in the boys' doubles and the team events at the European Junior Championships. Søgaard was part of the Denmark winning team at the 2019, 2021, 2023 European Mixed Team and the 2020 European Men's Team Championships.

Achievements

BWF World Junior Championships 
Boys' doubles

European Junior Championships 
Boys' doubles

Mixed doubles

BWF World Tour (1 runner-up) 
The BWF World Tour, which was announced on 19 March 2017 and implemented in 2018, is a series of elite badminton tournaments sanctioned by the Badminton World Federation (BWF). The BWF World Tours are divided into levels of World Tour Finals, Super 1000, Super 750, Super 500, Super 300 (part of the HSBC World Tour), and the BWF Tour Super 100.

Men's doubles

BWF International Challenge/Series (7 titles, 5 runners-up) 
Men's doubles

  BWF International Challenge tournament
  BWF International Series tournament
  BWF Future Series tournament

References

External links 
 

1997 births
Living people
People from Nyborg
People from Nyborg Municipality
Danish male badminton players
Sportspeople from the Region of Southern Denmark